Sylvie Guillem    (born 23 February 1965) is a French ballet dancer. Guillem was the top-ranking female dancer with the Paris Opera Ballet from 1984 to 1989, before becoming a principal guest artist with the Royal Ballet in London. She has performed contemporary dance as an Associate Artist of London's Sadler's Wells Theatre. Her most notable performances have included those in Giselle and in Rudolf Nureyev's stagings of Swan Lake and Don Quixote. In November 2014, she announced her retirement from the stage in 2015.

Biography

Early life
Guillem was born on 23 February 1965 in Paris, and raised in the suburbs in a working-class family. As a child, she trained in gymnastics under the instruction of her mother, a gymnastics teacher. Her father was a car mechanic.

In 1977 at age 11, she began training at the Paris Opera Ballet School where Claude Bessy, then director of the school, immediately noticed her exceptional capacities and potential, and in 1981 at age 16, she joined the company's corps de ballet. Initially she hated dancing, preferring gymnastics, but after taking part in her show she found she loved performing.

Career
In 1983, Guillem was awarded the Special Prize of the Youth Organization of Varna in junior division at the Varna International Ballet Competition, which later in the year earned her her first solo role, dancing the Queen of the Dryads in Rudolf Nureyev's staging of Don Quixote.  On 29 December 1984, after her performance in Nureyev's Swan Lake, she became the Paris Opera Ballet's youngest ever étoile, the company's top-ranking female dancer. In 1987, she performed the lead role in William Forsythe's contemporary ballet In the Middle, Somewhat Elevated with one of her favourite partners, Laurent Hilaire.

In 1988, she was given the title role in a production of Giselle staged by the Royal Ballet to celebrate Nureyev's 50th birthday. Her performance was a success, and in the following year she left Paris for London, to become a freelance performer and one of the Royal Ballet's principal guest artists. Her desire to work independently from a company gained her the nickname "Mademoiselle Non". In 1995, Guillem created the dance television program, Evidentia, which won several international awards. In 1998, she staged her own version of Giselle for the Finnish National Ballet, and in 2001 restaged the ballet for La Scala Ballet in Milan.

In 2001, she became the first winner of the Nijinsky Prize for the world's best ballerina, although in her acceptance speech she criticised the "supermarket culture" of such awards. In the same year, she controversially appeared nude and without make-up in a photo-shoot for French Vogue.

In 2003, she directed the central section of a Nureyev tribute program, but was criticised for having the dancers perform in front of a giant projected backdrop of Nureyev, which the audience found distracting. By 2006, she had moved from ballet to contemporary dance, working with such performers as Akram Khan as an Associate Artist of the Sadler's Wells Theatre in London.

In March 2015, Guillem embarked on an international farewell tour titled Life in Progress, featuring works by Khan, Russell Maliphant, Mats Ek and Forsythe.

The tour concluded in Japan, and she gave her final performance live on Japanese television on 31 December 2015, performing Maurice Béjart's Boléro as the clock counted down to midnight local time. The performance ended right at the stroke of midnight local time on 1 January 2016. In 2021, Guillem gave her first interview since retiring to speak about her life and artisty, as part of a talk with Daniil Simkin.

Personal life
As of 2006, Guillem was in a long-term relationship with photographer Gilles Tapie.

She is a supporter of environmental group Sea Shepherd. She is a total vegan.

Repertoire
Guillem's repertoire includes Giselle (Giselle), Swan Lake (Odette/Odile), Don Quixote (Kitri), In the Middle, Somewhat Elevated, Romeo and Juliet (Juliet), The Sleeping Beauty (Aurora), Boléro, Cinderella, Notre-Dame de Paris, Raymonda, La Bayadère (Nikiya and Gamzatti), Fall River Legend, Prince of the Pagodas (Princess Rose), Hermann Schmermann, Le Martyre de Saint-Sébastien, and Sacred Monsters (with Akram Khan).

Awards
Guillem has received numerous decorations during her career.
 1983 : Special Prize of the Youth Organization of Varna at the Varna International Ballet Competition
 1984 : Prix du Cercle Carpeaux (Paris)
 1988 : Andersen Prize (Copenhagen), Grand Prix national de danse (Paris), Commandeur of the Arts et Lettres (Paris)
 1989 : Grand Prix Pavlova
 1993 : Médaille de Vermeil de la Ville de Paris
 1994 : Prix Benois de la Danse
 1994 : Chevalier of the Légion d'honneur
 1999 : Officier of the Ordre national du Mérite
 2000 : Gente Dame of honor of the Hospitaliers de Pomerol
 2001 : Prix Nijinski
 2003 : Honorary Commander of the Order of the British Empire
 2009 : Officier of the Légion d'honneur
 2012 : Golden Lion for Lifetime Achievement, from the Biennale Danza of Venice
 2015 : Praemium Imperiale, Tokyo
 2015 : Society of London Theatre Special Award
 2016 : Critics' Circle National Dance Award: De Valois Award for outstanding achievements

References

External links

1965 births
Living people
French ballerinas
Prima ballerinas
Prix Benois de la Danse winners
Honorary Commanders of the Order of the British Empire
Commandeurs of the Ordre des Arts et des Lettres
Commanders of the Ordre national du Mérite
Officiers of the Légion d'honneur
Paris Opera Ballet étoiles